Stretch were a 1970s British rock band that grew from the collaboration between vocalist Elmer Gantry (real name Dave Terry) and guitarist Kirby Gregory (real name Graham Gregory). Gantry had been the frontman of Elmer Gantry's Velvet Opera, and Kirby had been a member of Curved Air.

Formation
The band was put together in 1974 with help from Fleetwood Mac manager Clifford Davis and drummer Mick Fleetwood, to perform as Fleetwood Mac on a U.S. tour because the existing Fleetwood Mac were not in a position to fulfil outstanding contractual obligations. However, Fleetwood did not join the tour as planned, and later denied any knowledge or involvement, and partway through the tour it became obvious to audiences that there was no original member of Fleetwood Mac in the band, and the tour collapsed. Bass player Paul Martinez claimed, "Mick Fleetwood pulled out at the last minute claiming not to know who we were!"

Music career
Stretch rose from the ashes of this debacle, and soon had a No. 16 hit single in November 1975 with "Why Did You Do It?", the lyric of which was a direct attack on Mick Fleetwood for his failure to join the band on the ill-fated U.S. tour. In the official video for the record bass player Paul Martinez wore a traditional keffiyeh head-dress. Besides bass player Martinez, guitarist Kirby and Jim Russell on drums and tambourine, the single featured electric guitar by Hiroshi Kato and horns by Bud Beadle, Chris Mercer, Mick Eve, Mike Bailey and Ron Carthy. The band followed the single up with the album Elastique, but during the recording of this album, Martinez was sacked.

Drummer Jim Russell left the band before the recording of the second album, You Can't Beat Your Brain for Entertainment, due to musical differences. He was replaced by future Status Quo drummer Jeff Rich. Two more albums were made, but Gantry left before the last album, Forget the Past. Another blow came in 1979 when manager Davis decided to withdraw his financial input, and the band eventually split up.

In 1999, Italian DJ Gigi D'Agostino used distorted vocal samples from the first line of the song "Why Did You Do It?", in order to produce his own track "Bla Bla Bla". The samples were deliberately used in a way that made the vocals make no sense.

Stretch reformed in 2007 to coincide with a "Greatest Hits" collection, and toured in support of the Jeff Healey Band.

In 2011, the band released the album Unfinished Business, an 11-track recording for Repertoire Records including original songs, covers and a new version of "Why Did You Do It?".

Cover versions
In 2012, German producer Ferry Ultra recorded a version of "Why Did You Do It?" featuring Canadian vocalist Ashley Slater for the album Ferry Ultra and the Homeless Funkers.

Personnel
Current members
Elmer Gantry (Dave "Elmer" Terry) – vocals, guitar (1974–78, 2007–present)
Kirby Gregory (Graham Gregory) – guitar, vocals (1974–79, 2007–present)
Jim Scadding – bass guitar (2007–present)
Justin Hildreth – drums (2009–present)

Former members
Paul Martinez – bass guitar (1974–75)
Craig Collinge – drums (1974)
John Wilkinson – keyboards (1974)
Jim Russell – drums (1974–76)
Hiroshi Kato – guitar (1974)
John Cook – keyboards (1975)
Dave Evans – bass guitar (1975–76)
Steve Emery – bass guitar (1976–79)
Jeff Rich – drums (1976–78, 2007–09)
Nicko McBrain – drums (1978–79)

Discography

Albums
Elastique (1975) (Anchor)
You Can't Beat Your Brain for Entertainment (1976) (Anchor)
Lifeblood (1977) (Anchor)
Forget the Past (1978) (Hot Wax - not the US label of the same name)
Can't Judge a Book... The Peel Sessions (1996) (Strange Fruit)
Stretch: The Story of Elmer Gantry (1996)  (Repertoire)
Why Did You Do It: The Best of Stretch (2007) (Repertoire)
That's the Way the Wind Blows – A Collection (2011) (Repertoire)
Unfinished Business (2011) (Repertoire)

Singles

Notes

References

External links
Official band website
 Discography at Discogs.

Musical groups established in 1974
Musical groups reestablished in 2007
Musical groups disestablished in 1979
English blues rock musical groups
English pop rock music groups